Princess Chulabhorn's Science High School Loei  (: PCSHSLOEI) is a medium-sized secondary school in Loei province. Type of State School of Science. In addition, Princess Chulabhorn's College Loei is ranked 96th out of 2,800th schools nationwide. Based on the O-net test results for the year 2016 The past and the 1st in the province.

Curriculum
Originally, PCC's curriculum depended on The Ministry of Education but the schools' course of instruction was changed in 2010 by cooperation of Mahidol Wittayanusorn School (Public Organization), a Thailand science high school, and have used this curriculum since then. The PCC's students receive scholarships from the government for study, food, accommodation, etc.

Symbols

The schools' logo is a crown cover letter "จภ." (Jaw-Por). "จภ." is the short version of the name of Princess Chulabhorn Walailak. The symbolic colors are blue, representing the Thai monarchy, a security-oriented, strict disciplinarian. And red-orange, which represents the traditional Thai color for Thursday, the day that Princess Chulabhorn Walailak was born (4 July 1957).

The symbolic tree is Spathodea (Thai: แคแสด). This tree has orange-red flowers that represent the symbolic color of the schools.

The school’s quote is “Moral lead academic matter”. It shows that the PCC’s students have moral principle to bring their knowledge to use.

O-NET average 
This is O-NET average of Princess Chulabhorn's College Loei in 5 Basic Subject. They are Math, Science, Social study, English and Thai language. This is the national test of grade 12 in secondary level.

School in PCC group 
The PCC includes 12 boarding schools. They are:

References

External links
Homepage of Princess Chulabhorn's College Loei

Schools in Thailand
Science education in Thailand
Boarding schools in Thailand
Schools in Loei Province
Educational institutions established in 1994
1994 establishments in Thailand